The Immanuel Lutheran Church is a historic church in rural Jones County, South Dakota. It is a simple wood-frame structure, with wooden clapboard siding, a gable roof, and a small tower rising in the front (eastern) facade. Despite the exterior severity, its interior is more richly appointed, with Gothic Revival woodwork adorning the pews, railings, and pulpit. The church was built by this small Norwegian community in 1924, the congregation having met in less formal settings after its founding in 1907. Use of the church declined beginning in the 1930s; it underwent restoration in the late 1980s.

The church was listed on the National Register of Historic Places in 1988.

See also
National Register of Historic Places listings in Jones County, South Dakota

References

Lutheran churches in South Dakota
Churches on the National Register of Historic Places in South Dakota
Churches completed in 1924
Buildings and structures in Jones County, South Dakota
National Register of Historic Places in Jones County, South Dakota